Sardinoides is an extinct genus of prehistoric ray-finned fish from the Campanian. It is a member of the Myctophiformes order, and considered a sister group to Paleogene and modern neoscopelids and myctophids.

References

External links
 Bony fish in the online Sepkoski Database

Myctophiformes